NV6 may refer to:

 NV6 engine
 NV6, a minor planet, see List of minor planets: 23001–24000
 Nikitin NV-6, a single seat aerobatic biplane
 NV 6, U.S. Route 6 in Nevada